Scotolathys is a monotypic genus of  cribellate araneomorph spiders in the family Dictynidae containing the single species, Scotolathys simplex. It was first described by Eugène Simon in 1884, and separated from Lathys into its own genus in 2009. Species occur in Algeria, Spain, Macedonia, Greece, Ukraine, and in Israel.

References

Dictynidae
Monotypic Araneomorphae genera
Spiders of Africa
Spiders of Asia
Taxa named by Eugène Simon